The United States has had five African-American elected office holders prior to 1867.  After Congress passed the First Military Reconstruction Act of 1867 and ratified the Fifteenth Amendment to the United States Constitution in 1870, African Americans began to be elected or appointed to national, state, county and local offices throughout the United States.

Four of the five office holders served in a New England state.  Three officeholders served as state legislators.

Wentworth Cheswell first served in an elective office in 1776 as a local school board member in Newmarket, New Hampshire, and later as a justice of the peace (making him the first African American to serve as a judge). He would serve in elective office until his death in 1817.
Alexander Lucius Twilight was an American educator, politician, and minister.  He was the first African American to earn a college degree from an American College at Middlebury College in 1823. He is the first African American elected to serve in a state legislature, the Vermont House of Representatives in 1836. Twilight was also a minister and secondary school principal, building Athenian Hall at the Orleans County Grammar Schools.
John Mercer Langston
Edward Garrison Walker, state legislator in Massachusetts
Charles Lewis Mitchell was the other African American elected as a state legislator in Massachusetts (1866). He served a one-year term in the Massachusetts House of Representatives.  During the American Civil War he served in the 55th Massachusetts Colored Volunteer Infantry and lost a foot during the Battle of Honey Hill.

List of African-American officeholders of the United States, 1789–1866
 Political Parties

See also

Federal government

African Americans in the United States Congress
List of African-American United States representatives
List of African-American United States senators
Congressional Black Caucus
Congressional Black Caucus Foundation
List of African-American United States Cabinet members
List of African-American officeholders during Reconstruction

State and local government
List of African-American U.S. state firsts
List of first African-American mayors
List of African-American statewide elected officials

References

Bibliography

 
Lists of African-American people
Lists of political office-holders in the United States
Political history of the United States